The 2014 Troy Trojans football team represented Troy University during the 2014 NCAA Division I FBS football season. They were led by 24th-year head coach Larry Blakeney and played their home games at Veterans Memorial Stadium as a member of the Sun Belt Conference. They finished the season 3–9 overall and 3–4 in Sun Belt play to finish in a tie for seventh place.

On October 5, Blakeney announced that he would retire at the end of the 2014 season. He finish his career with a 24-year record of 178–112–1.

Schedule

References

Troy
Troy Trojans football seasons
Troy Trojans football